A rotor current meter (RCM) is a mechanical current meter, an oceanographic device deployed within an oceanographic mooring measuring the flow within the world oceans to learn more about ocean currents. Many RCMs have been replaced by instruments measuring the flow by hydroacoustics, the so-called Acoustic Doppler Current Profilers. However, for instance in Fram Strait, the Alfred Wegener Institute still uses RCMs for long-term monitoring the inflow into the Arctic Ocean.

Measurement principle

A RCM usually consists of the recording unit, a propeller to detect the water velocity and vane to determine the direction of the flow. The gimbal rings of the RCM-instruments allow to compensate a tilt of up to 40° of the mooring line.

The recording unit houses a battery pack for energy supply, the Analog-to-digital converter, possible additional sensors for other variables (like the standard parameters conductivity, temperature, depth, CTD) and a micro-controller. According to the data sheet of the instruments RCM 7/8, the micro-controller performs the following tasks:

The flow direction is detected by a magnetic compass,  a needle clamped onto a potentiometer. This design becomes problematic for instruments in the Arctic Ocean since the North Magnetic Pole moves relative to the geographic North Pole and this (time-depended) magnetic declination cannot be neglected any more.

Data quality
Accuracy and precision of the RCMs are topic of an ongoing discussion. Comparative studies between different types of RCMs placed close to each other show that the instruments have large systematical errors. 

The following table summarizes the specification for various single-point current meters. 

These values only hold for medium currents between 0.02 and 2.95 m/s. Small velocities  are difficult to detect because the vane shows a lot of inertia and the rotor needs to overcome friction before starting to rotate.
The company Aanderaa calls the acoustical single-point instruments recording current meter which allows to keep the abbreviation RCM.

References

External links
 Aanderaa's Recording Current Meters (RCM-9 + RCM-11) are no longer working mechanically, but their ancestors RCM-7 did, see Arctic Marine Engineering-Geological Expeditions:  Oceanographic equipment
 Falmouth Scientific's Point Velocity Acoustic Current do no longer include any Rotor Current Meter.
 The German Maritime Museum in Bremerhaven exhibits a large collection of mechanical current meters.

Physical oceanography
Oceanographic instrumentation
Ocean currents